Anderson Esiti (born 24 May 1994) is a Nigerian professional footballer who plays as a midfielder for Hungarian NB I club Ferencváros and the Nigeria national team.

Club career
Born on 24 May 1994, in Warri, Esiti took his first steps in Football Academy Bobbies United. In 2012 he made his trip to Europe to join Leixões. After a few games with the second-string team, he was promoted to the senior side of the club, and played 45 matches. His overall performance caught the eye of José Mário Branco, technical director of Estoril at the time and they signed him. He fit right at in his new team. He remained there for two seasons, featuring in 57 appearances. He established himself as one of the leading midfielders in the league and attracted interest from various clubs around Europe. Eventually he signed with Gent making a total of 95 appearances in all competitions.

On 25 July 2019, PAOK confirmed the arrival of Esiti, who signed a four-year contract with the club. The transfer fee paid to Gent was €3.5 million. He was to fill a gap in defensive midfield for PAOK as the midfielders Jose Canas and Yevhen Shakhov, key members of the PAOK squad, had already left the club this summer. In the 2018–19 season, Esiti made 30 appearances for Gent across all competitions.

In his first match with PAOK after his return from the loan to Göztepe, in a friendly match against Volos, Esiti scored his first goal for PAOK.

In February 2022, Esiti moved to Hungarian club Ferencváros. PAOK retained a percentage in their rights in the event of a resale.

Career statistics

Club

Honours
Ferencvárosi TC
 Nemzeti Bajnokság I: 2021–22
 Magyar Kupa: 2021-22

PAOK
Greek Football Cup: 2020–21

References

External links

Anderson Esiti at PAOKFC.gr
Anderson Esiti at playmakerstats.com (English version of calciozz.it)

1994 births
Living people
Nigerian footballers
Nigerian expatriate footballers
Nigeria international footballers
Liga Portugal 2 players
Belgian Pro League players
Super League Greece players
Süper Lig players
Leixões S.C. players
G.D. Estoril Praia players
K.A.A. Gent players
PAOK FC players
Ferencvárosi TC footballers
Expatriate footballers in Portugal
Nigerian expatriate sportspeople in Portugal
Expatriate footballers in Belgium
Nigerian expatriate sportspeople in Belgium
Expatriate footballers in Greece
Nigerian expatriate sportspeople in Greece
Expatriate footballers in Hungary
Nigerian expatriate sportspeople in Hungary
Association football midfielders
Sportspeople from Warri